Zina Bianca Bethune (February 17, 1945 – February 12, 2012) was an American actress, dancer, and choreographer.

Early years
Bethune was born on Staten Island, the daughter of Ivy ( Vigder), a Russian-born (Sevastopol, present-day Ukraine) actress who started in the Superman radio series, and later became known for playing "Miss Tuttle" on Father Murphy and "Abigail" on General Hospital.   Zina's father, William Charles Bethune, was a sculptor and painter who died in 1950 when Zina was five years old.

Career

Theater and dance
Bethune began her formal ballet training aged six at George Balanchine's School of American Ballet.

By age 14 she was dancing with the New York City Ballet as Clara in the original 1954 Balanchine production of The Nutcracker. Bethune's first professional acting role was at age six, with a small part in the off-Broadway play Monday's Heroes, produced by Stella Holt at the Greenwich Mews Theater.

Television
As a child performer, Bethune appeared in the original cast of The Most Happy Fella as well as several American daytime television dramas, including a stint as the first "Robin Lang" on The Guiding Light from May 1956 to April 1958. Bethune played President Franklin D. Roosevelt's daughter in Sunrise at Campobello in 1960.

Newspaper columnist Dick Kleiner described Bethune's performance in a 1958 television production as a "shatteringly beautiful portrayal of Tennessee Williams' young heroine in This Property Is Condemned."

In October 1958, she portrayed Amy March in the CBS musical adaptation of Little Women. She portrayed nurse Gail Lucas on The Nurses (1962–65), and appeared in other series, including Kraft Television Theatre (with Martin Huston in the series finale), Route 66, The Judy Garland Show, Pantomime Quiz, Hollywood Squares, Young Dr. Malone, Dr. Kildare, Gunsmoke, The Invaders, and Emergency!

Film
Bethune starred as "The Girl" alongside Harvey Keitel in Martin Scorsese's first feature film, Who's That Knocking at My Door, released in 1967, although much of it (including Bethune's acting parts) was filmed in 1965 for Scorsese's student film project at New York University.

Other work
Throughout her life, Bethune worked with disabled students. She herself was diagnosed with scoliosis at age 11, and hip dysplasia diagnosed at 17.

Bethune founded Bethune Theatredanse (now called Theatre Bethune) in 1981, a nonprofit dance and drama company that has toured internationally and performed at the White House. The company has been designated as the official resident company of the Los Angeles Theatre Center.

She founded Dance Outreach, now known as Infinite Dreams, in 1980, which, as of 2012, enrolls about 8,000 disabled children in dance-related activities throughout Southern California.

Death
On February 12, 2012, five days before her 67th birthday, Bethune was killed in an apparent hit and run accident while she was trying to help an injured opossum in Griffith Park, Los Angeles.

Filmography

References

External links

1945 births
2012 deaths
Actresses from New York City
American people of Russian-Jewish descent
American choreographers
American female dancers
20th-century American dancers
American film actresses
American television actresses
Jewish American actresses
Burials at Mount Sinai Memorial Park Cemetery
Road incident deaths in California
Pedestrian road incident deaths
20th-century American actresses
Dancers from New York (state)
21st-century American Jews
21st-century American women